Otomesostomatidae is a family of flatworms belonging to the order Proseriata.

Genera:
 Baikalotomesostoma Timoshkin, Lukhnev & Zaytseva, 2010
 Otomesostoma Graff, 1882

References

Platyhelminthes